Little Walnut Township is a township in Butler County, Kansas, USA.  As of the 2000 census, its population was 1,002.

Little Walnut Township was organized in 1877.

Geography
The Leon town site was laid out and surveyed in November 1879. Its population as of 2010 was 704. According to the USGS, the Little Walnut Township contains two cemeteries: Leon and Quito.

The streams of North Branch Little Walnut River and South Branch Little Walnut River run through this township.

Further reading

References

 USGS Geographic Names Information System (GNIS)

External links
 City-Data.com

Townships in Butler County, Kansas
Townships in Kansas